Donald Clark Osmond is the ninth studio album released by Donny Osmond in 1977.  "(You've Got Me) Dangling on a String" was released as a single. The album peaked at No. 169 on the Billboard Top LPs chart.

Track listing

Personnel
Donny Osmond - Main Vocals
Ben Benay, Greg Poree, Lee Ritenour, Mitch Holder, Thom Rotella - Guitars
Dan Wyman - Synthesizers
Ronald Coleman - Keyboards
John Barnes - Keyboards, Synthesizers
Tony Newton - Bass
Ed Greene, James Gadson - Drums
Bob Zimmitti, Gary Coleman - Percussion
Eddie "Bongo" Brown, Ollie Brown, Paulinho Da Costa - Congas

References

http://osmondmania.com/Discography2/Album_Pages/DonaldClarkOsmond.html

Donny Osmond albums
1977 albums
Albums produced by Brian Holland
Polydor Records albums